The Kirk Johnson Building is a historic commercial building located in Lancaster, Lancaster County, Pennsylvania.  It was designed by noted Lancaster architect C. Emlen Urban and built in 1911–1912.  It is a four-story, narrow, steel frame structure clad in white tile and cut stone in the Beaux-Arts style. This section of the Kirk Johnson Building measures 16 feet wide and features a copper-clad mansard roof. The original French-style display windows were restored in 1979–1980.  It was built to house the Kirk Johnson music store.

It was added to the National Register of Historic Places in 1980.

References

Commercial buildings on the National Register of Historic Places in Pennsylvania
Beaux-Arts architecture in Pennsylvania
Commercial buildings completed in 1912
Buildings and structures in Lancaster, Pennsylvania
1912 establishments in Pennsylvania
National Register of Historic Places in Lancaster, Pennsylvania